WhyNot Jazz Room was a jazz club situated at 14 Christopher St. in West Village, New York City. It opened in December 2013 and was featuring up to 70 bands a month. Trumpeter Theo Croker was a frequent performer at the club on Thursday's with his band DVRK FUNK. Owner Emil Stefkov says of it: "It’s not a club; it’s a room. Many musicians who play here love this place simply because it’s very intimate, very small. The guests when they come here and they listen—they can feel it."

References

External links
Official site

Jazz clubs in New York City
West Village
Christopher Street